Prabhat Kumar College, also known as Kanthi College or by the abbreviation P. K. College, established in 1926, is the oldest college in Purba Medinipur district. It offers undergraduate courses in arts, commerce and sciences. It is affiliated to Vidyasagar University.

History
Prabhat Kumar College was established in 1926 at Contai with a large donation from the Biswambhar Dinda in memory of his loving son, the Late Prabhat Kumar Dinda. It is the oldest college of Purba Medinipur district. This college was named after the name of the Late Prabhat Kumar Dinda, the son of donator Late Biswambhar Dinda. Initially, the college was started as an arts college under the affiliation of University of Calcutta. In 1985, the affiliation of the college was changed from University of Calcutta to Vidyasagar University.

Location
The college is located in the heart of Contai in the Purba Medinipur district. Contai Central Bus Stand is 250m from the college.

Departments and Courses
The college offers different undergraduate and postgraduate courses in the science, arts, and commerce branch. This college aims at imparting education to the undergraduates of lower- and middle-class people of Kanthi and its adjoining areas. Almost every department of this college offers undergraduate degree courses. Postgraduate courses are offered only by departments of Bengali, English, Sanskrit, Physics, Chemistry, and Commerce.

Science
The science faculty consists of the departments of Physics, Chemistry, Mathematics, Computer Science and Application, Anthropology, Botany, Zoology, Physiology, Nutrition, and Aquaculture Management.

Arts and Commerce
The arts and commerce faculty consists of the departments of Bengali, English, Sanskrit, History, Geography, Political Science, Philosophy, Economics, Education, Physical Education, Music, Sociology, and Commerce.

Accreditation
In 2022, Prabhat Kumar College is re-accredited and awarded Grade A by the National Assessment and Accreditation Council (NAAC).  Previously in March 2007, this college was awarded B+ grade by the NAAC. This college is recognized by the University Grants Commission (UGC).

See also

References

External links
 Prabhat Kumar College

Colleges affiliated to Vidyasagar University
Educational institutions established in 1926
Universities and colleges in Purba Medinipur district
1926 establishments in India